Field hockey is one of seventeen core sports at the 2002 Commonwealth Games in Manchester. It was the second appearance of hockey at the Commonwealth Games since its inclusion in 1998.

Medal table

Men's tournament

Medalists

Women's tournament

Medalists 

 
Hockey
2002
2002
Commonwealth Games